D66 may refer to:

 Delta Junction Airport, a public airport in Alaska with FAA code D66
 d66 (die), a dice roll used in some role-playing games and old wargames
 D66 road (Croatia), a state road in Croatia
 Democrats 66, commonly known as D66, a political party in the Netherlands
 HMS Emerald (D66), an Emerald-class light cruiser
 D66 strain of Chlamydomonas reinhardtii
 Queen's Gambit Declined, Encyclopedia of Chess Openings code